The United Kingdom Biodiversity Action Plan or (UK BAP) was the UK government's response to the Convention on Biological Diversity, opened for signature at the Rio Earth Summit in 1992. The UK was the first country to produce a national Biodiversity Action Plan. It was published in 1994 and created action plans for priority species and habitats in the UK that were most under threat so as to support their recovery.

Purpose

The UK Biodiversity Action Plan summarised the most threatened or rapidly declining biological resources of the United Kingdom, and gave detailed plans for their conservation. Individual 'Action Plans' were provided for these habitats and species, and a reporting mechanism was established to demonstrate how the UK BAP was contributing to the United Kingdom's commitment to help reduce or halt the significant losses in global biodiversity, highlighted by the international Convention on Biological Diversity. The original publication included action plans for 45 habitats and 391 species, each identified either as being globally threatened, or where evidence showed there had been a particularly rapid decline of those resources within the UK. Although mainly focused on England, Wales, Scotland, Northern Ireland and the UK Crown dependencies, the UK Biodiversity Action Plan also addressed issues of declining species and habitats overseas in the UK Dependant Territories and British-held territories in Antarctica; areas together containing over 700 endemic species.

History
At the launch of Biodiversity: The UK Action Plan in January 1994, the UK Prime Minister announced the formation of a 'Biodiversity Steering Group', drawing on experts from key conservation organisations and government agencies. It was tasked with identifying and preparing costed action plans for priority species and habitats by 1995, and with developing methodologies for monitoring progress and improving public awareness and access to biodiversity information.
In 1995 the Biodiversity Steering Group published a two-volume report, the second part of which contained three important lists of species: 
 a 'Long List' contained 1252 species, selected using broad criteria;
 a 'Middle List' contained over 300 species for which action plans should be produced over the subsequent three years;
 a 'Short List' of 116 species for which action plans had already been devised.

The criteria for selection as a Biodiversity Action Plan species on the 'long list' were:
 being a threatened UK endemic or other globally threatened species;
 being a species where the UK holds more than a quarter of its world population;
 being a species where its numbers or distribution range have declined by more than 25% over the last 25 years;
 being (in some cases) a species found in less than fifteen 10 kilometre squares in the UK;
 being listed in the EU Birds or Habitats Directives, the Bern, Bonn or CITES Conventions, or under the Wildlife and Countryside Act 1981 or the Nature Conservation and Amenity Lands (Northern Ireland) Order 1985.

After devolution in 1998, England, Wales and Scotland had all developed their own individual biodiversity strategies by 2002, with Northern Ireland following shortly afterwards, whilst still also collaborating.

By 2007 the criteria used to select priority habitats and priority species had been reviewed and the lists updated to propose that 40 UK BAP habitats and 1,149 species were included in the UK priority lists, and a further 123 species were proposed for removal.

As of 2009 1,150 species and 65 habitats were identified as needing conservation and greater protection and were covered by UK BAPs. The updated list included the hedgehog, house sparrow, grass snake and the garden tiger moth, while otters, bottlenose dolphins and red squirrels remained in need of habitat protection.

In 2012 the UK Biodiversity Action Plan was succeeded by the 'UK Post-2010 Biodiversity Framework'. This was produced on behalf of the Four Countries' Biodiversity Group (4CBG) by Defra and the JNCC. But the work identifying priority species and priority habitats remains relevant, and was then enshrined in appendices to the NERC Act (2006).

Priority species and priority habitats
As the UK BAP developed, the most important species and habitats that it identified for action were referred to as 'priority species' and 'priority habitats' ( also: 'UK BAP species' and UK BAP habitats').

Priority habitats 

Rivers
Oligotrophic and dystrophic Lakes
Ponds
Mesotrophic lakes
Eutrophic standing waters
Aquifer fed naturally fluctuating water bodies
Arable field margins
Hedgerows
Traditional orchards
Wood-pasture and parkland
Upland oakwood
Lowland beech and yew woodland
Upland mixed ashwoods
Wet woodland
Lowland mixed deciduous woodland
Upland birchwoods
Native pine woodlands
Lowland dry acid grassland
Lowland calcareous grassland
Upland calcareous grassland
Lowland meadows
Upland hay meadows
Coastal and floodplain grazing marsh
Lowland heathland
Upland heathland
Upland flushes, fens and swamps
Purple moor grass and rush pastures
Lowland fens
Reedbeds
Lowland raised bog
Blanket bog
Mountain heaths and willow scrub
Inland rock outcrop and scree habitats
Calaminarian grasslands
Open mosaic habitats on previously developed land
Limestone pavement
Maritime cliff and slopes
Coastal vegetated shingle
Machair
Coastal sand dunes
Intertidal chalk
Intertidal boulder communities
Sabellaria alveolata reefs
Coastal saltmarsh
Intertidal mudflats
Seagrass beds
Sheltered muddy gravels
Peat and clay exposures
Subtidal chalk
Tide-swept channels
Fragile sponge & anthozoan communities on subtidal rocky habitats
Estuarine rocky habitats
Seamount communities
Carbonate mounds
Cold-water coral reefs
Deep-sea sponge communities
Sabellaria spinulosa reefs
Subtidal sands and gravels
Horse mussel beds
Mud habitats in deep water
File shell beds
Maerl beds
Serpulid reefs
Blue mussel beds
Saline lagoons

Priority Species 
A list of UK BAP priority species can be viewed here.

Regional response
The regional response to guidelines published in 1995 led to 162 Local Biodiversity Action Plans (LBAPs) being produced for England, Wales and Scotland, with further action plans later produced for Northern Ireland. These were usually formulated by a broad partnership of conservation organisations working on county and similar-sized areas of Britain. LBAPs play an important role in translating national and sub-national strategies, priorities and targets into direct local action on the ground, and in identifying which UK priority species and habitats are found in that local area.

See also
 List of United Kingdom Biodiversity Action Plan species
 List of species and habitats of principal importance in England
 List of habitats of principal importance in Wales
 Endangered Species Recovery Plan (United States)

References

External links
The UK BAP website (http://www.ukbap.org.uk/) was in operation between 2001 and 2011, when it was closed as part of a government review of websites.  The core content was migrated into the JNCC website.
The National Archives preserves snapshops of UK BAP webpages predating publication of the UK Biodiversity Framework, for example copies from 2011  and 2012 .

UK Biodiversity Action Plan, Joint Nature Conservation Committee.

Conservation in the United Kingdom
Action plans